Edward Crossan (17 November 1925 – 13 June 2006) was a Northern Irish footballer who played at both professional and international levels, as an inside forward.

Career
Born in Derry, Crossan spent his early career in his native Northern Ireland with Glentoran and Derry City, before signing with English club Blackburn Rovers in November 1947. Crossan spent eleven seasons in the Football League with both Blackburn and Tranmere Rovers, scoring 79 goals in 326 games. He later played for Cork Hibernians.

Crossan also earned three caps for Northern Ireland between 1949 and 1955, scoring one goal, including appearing in one FIFA World Cup qualifying match.

Personal life
Crossan retired to Derry, where he raised nine children.

His younger brother Johnny was also a footballer.

References

External links
 
 

1925 births
2006 deaths
Association football forwards
Association footballers from Northern Ireland
Expatriate association footballers from Northern Ireland
Northern Ireland international footballers
Glentoran F.C. players
Derry City F.C. players
Blackburn Rovers F.C. players
Tranmere Rovers F.C. players
Cork Hibernians F.C. players
English Football League players
NIFL Premiership players
League of Ireland players
Pre-1950 IFA international footballers